The Panther Academy (formally the Academy of Earth & Space Science) is a four-year public high school in Paterson in Passaic County, New Jersey, United States, operated as part of the Paterson Public Schools. It is one of a number of academy programs serving students in ninth through twelfth grades offered by the school district. The program focuses on earth science and space science as part of a partnership with Passaic County Community College and grants from NASA.

As of the 2021–22 school year, the school had an enrollment of 209 students and 18.0 classroom teachers (on an FTE basis), for a student–teacher ratio of 11.6:1. There were 120 students (57.4% of enrollment) eligible for free lunch and none eligible for reduced-cost lunch.

Awards, recognition and rankings
The school was the 303rd-ranked public high school in New Jersey out of 339 schools statewide in New Jersey Monthly magazine's September 2014 cover story on the state's "Top Public High Schools", using a new ranking methodology.

The students of Panther Academy won second place at the 2015 state mathematics competition organized by the Association of Mathematics Teachers of New Jersey.

References

External links 
School website
Paterson Public Schools

School Data for the Paterson Public Schools, National Center for Education Statistics

Education in Paterson, New Jersey
Public high schools in Passaic County, New Jersey